Khalifa City is a residential suburb located in the Emirate of Abu Dhabi in the United Arab Emirates. It is popular among renters.

Subdivisions
Khalifa City was subdivided into three areas: Khalifa City A, Khalifa City B, and New Khalifa City. They have since been renamed to Khalifa City, Shakhbout City, and Zayed City respectively. All of these are currently being developed into what will become three major new districts of Abu Dhabi.

Khalifa City
Khalifa City A is on the main highway to Dubai, about 25 kilometres from Abu Dhabi, and is close to Abu Dhabi International Airport and Yas Island. Etihad Airways has its head office in Khalifa City A. Khalifa City A, which already has around 600-700 houses, will be adjacent to the prestigious Al Raha Beach project. This project will include residential and commercial units, as well as many international hotels. The project is being built by Aldar properties. Emirates ID have their HQ here.

Shakhbout City 
Shakhbout City is further inland and is near Bani Yas and Al Shawamekh. 

Formerly known as Khalifa City B.

Zayed City
The new Zayed City is planned to be between Khalifa City and Shakhbout City. It is also known as the Capital District, and is planned to be the new city center of Abu Dhabi.

References

Populated places in the Emirate of Abu Dhabi
Central Region, Abu Dhabi